The South Korea women's national under-21 field hockey team represents the Republic of Korea (South Korea).

Tournament record

Junior World Cup
1989 – 
1993 – 4th
1997 – 5th
2001 – 
2005 – 
2009 – 
2013 – 11th
2016 – 12th
2022 – 6th

Junior Asia Cup
1992 – 
1996 – 
2000 – 
2004 – 
2008 –
2012 – 
2015 – 
2021 – Cancelled
Source

Current squad

See also
South Korea women's national field hockey team

References

Field hockey
Asian women's national field hockey teams
National team
Women's national under-21 field hockey teams